Andre Khabbazi (born January 15, 1975, in Sacramento, California), a son of Assyrian American parents. Based in Los Angeles, California, he started his artistic career as an actor in several television series and soap operas and later on starred in a 2001 movie titled Circuit along with Jonathan Wade-Drahos and Kiersten Warren.

About 1.74 m in height (5' 8½"), Andre Khabbazi is also a semi-professional tennis player. He studied criminal justice at American River College in California.

Partial filmography 
 Days of Our Lives (2017–2018), as Henry Shah
 Diagnosis: Murder (2002), as "T. J. Mann" in episode "Must Kill TV"
 Circuit (2001), as Hector Ray
 Sunset Beach (1997–1999), as "Officer Oscar Ruiz"
 Melrose Place (1999), as "Tom Wright" in episode "Ahses to Ashes"
 Passions (1999), as the "Cop", in Episode #1026

External links 
 Andre Khabbazi on www.tv.com 
 

Living people
1975 births
American River College alumni
American people of Iranian-Assyrian descent
Male actors from California
American male television actors
People from Sacramento, California